Jonathan Pate Falwell (born September 7, 1966) is the senior pastor at the Thomas Road Baptist Church in Lynchburg, Virginia, and campus pastor at Liberty University.

Education
Falwell earned his Bachelor of Science degree from Liberty University in 1987, his Master of Arts degree in Religion from the Liberty Baptist Theological Seminary in 1995, and a Juris Doctor degree in 2005 from the Taft Law School in Santa Ana, California.

Family
He is the son and successor of the late Reverend Jerry Falwell and the brother of former Liberty University President Jerry Falwell Jr. His older sister, Jeannie, is a surgeon. During a 1974 family discussion about abortion as the 'national sin' of America, Jonathan asked his father why he did not do something about it, which was the start of his father's reading of other evangelical writers such as Francis Schaeffer on the issue.

Career
As a young adult and minister in his father's church, Thomas Road Baptist Church, Jonathan invested in video processing technology and began overseeing the operations of the church ministry. He became the executive pastor of Thomas Road, and was named senior pastor after his father died in 2007. Since then the church has grown and its influence in the community has expanded. He has been voted by local publications as one of the most influential people in the city multiple times. He has led the church to start multiple campuses, and created a church network (Liberty Church Network) to help equip pastors and plant churches. Under his leadership the church plants thousands of churches each year through the Liberty Church Network as well as partnerships with The Timothy Initiative.

In April 2021 the trustees of Liberty University named Falwell as the university's pastor. In June 2021 it was reported that they are considering naming him to the vacant post of university chancellor, which would "make Falwell one of the main stewards of the university and give him a role in hiring Liberty’s next president."

Personal life
Falwell and his wife, Shari, have four children: Jonathan Jr., Jessica, Natalie, and Nicholas. They reside in Lynchburg, Virginia.

References

External links 
 Archived personal webpage

1966 births
Living people
20th-century Baptists
21st-century American non-fiction writers
21st-century Baptist ministers from the United States
American Christian theologians
American Christian writers
American Christian Zionists
American evangelicals
American male non-fiction writers
American television evangelists
Baptists from Virginia
Liberty University alumni
Liberty University faculty
Writers from Lynchburg, Virginia
Southern Baptist ministers
21st-century American male writers
Jerry Falwell